Jonas Gladnikoff (born 11 January 1985) is a Swedish songwriter and music producer. Born in Täby, he began songwriting at an early age. Later in life he moved to Åland in Finland before eventually moving to Stockholm. He has written several songs for singers from across Europe, but is best known for writing entries for the Eurovision Song Contest and for various national pre-selections. He studied songwriting at the Music Production Academy Musikmakarna, graduating in 2006. In 2009 he co-wrote the song that represented Ireland. The song "Et Cetera" was performed by Sinéad Mulvey & Black Daisy in Moscow, Russia.
In the 2010 Eurovision Song Contest he once again co-wrote the Irish entry. The song, "It's for You", was performed by the 1993 Eurovision winning singer Niamh Kavanagh. He also later wrote the 2014 Irish entry "Heartbeat" sung by Can-linn.

Among his entries in national pre-selections for the Eurovision Song Contest he is best known for having co-written the runner up in the Dansk Melodi Grand Prix 2009, the Danish final, with the song "Someday" performed by the Icelandic singer Hera Björk, which became a big hit and also won the OGAE Second Chance Contest 2009 for Denmark. Gladnikoff is a member of the jazz pop project Technicoloured Roses. In 2021 he co-wrote and produced the song Llévame al cielo released by Drag Race España host Supremme DeLuxe and which was later also used as the final challenge of the first season of the show where the top four recorded their own version of the song.

Entries in the Eurovision Song Contest
 "Et Cetera" by Sinéad Mulvey & Black Daisy, Ireland, (Eurovision Song Contest 2009), 11th place (Semi-final)
 "It's for You" by Niamh Kavanagh, Ireland, (Eurovision Song Contest 2010), 23rd place (Final)
 "Heartbeat" by Can-linn feat. Kasey Smith, Ireland, (Eurovision Song Contest 2014), 12th place (Semi-final)

Entries in the Junior Eurovision Song Contest
 "Réalta na mara" by Aimee Banks, Ireland, (Junior Eurovision Song Contest 2015), 12th place
 "IOU" by Taylor Hynes, Ireland, (Junior Eurovision Song Contest 2018), 15th place
 "Banshee" by Anna Kearney, Ireland, (Junior Eurovision Song Contest 2019), 12th place
 "Solas" by Sophie Lennon, Ireland, (Junior Eurovision Song Contest 2022), 4th place

Entries in national Eurovision pre-selections
2006
 "Po dhe jo" by Ingrid Jushi (Albania 2006), eliminated (Semi-final)
2007
 "Open your eyes" by Charlene & Natasha (Bulgaria 2007), eliminated (Semi-final)
 "I Will Survive Without You" by Edgaras Kapocious (Lithuania 2007), 10th place (Quarter-final)
2009
 "Someday" by Hera Björk (Denmark 2009), 2nd place
 "Et Cetera" by Sinéad Mulvey & Black Daisy (Ireland 2009), 1st place
2010
 "Tonight" by Kafka & Ruta (Lithuania 2010), 4th place (Semi-final)
 "It's for You" by Niamh Kavanagh (Ireland 2010), 1st place
2011
 "Topsy Turvy" by J.Anvil (Malta 2011), 10th place
 "Falling" by Nikki Kavanagh (Ireland 2011), 2nd place
 "Sueños rotos" by Melissa (Spain 2011), 5th place
 "Volver" by Auryn (Spain 2011), 2nd place
 "Tensão" by Filipa Ruas (Portugal 2011), 4th place
2012
 "This Must Be Love" by Ana Mardare (Romania 2012), 13th place
2013
 "Meðal Andanna" by Birgitta Haukdal (Iceland 2013), 3rd place 
 "Fool In Love" by Davids & Dinara  (Latvia 2013), 11th place
 "Hullócsillag" by Mónika Hoffmann (Hungary 2013), eliminated (Semi-final)
 "Conquer My Heart" by Svetlana Bogdanova (Moldova 2013), 11th place
 "I Believe In Love" by Diana Hetea (Romania 2013), 12th place (Semi-final)
2014
 "Silent Tears" by VIG Roses (Lithuania 2014)
 "Heartbeat" by Can-linn feat. Kasey Smith (Ireland 2014), 1st place
2015
 "Right In" by Emily Charalambous (Cyprus 2015), 11th place
 "Sound of Colours" by Jurgis Bruzga (Lithuania 2015), 5th place
2016
 "All Around the World" by Deborah C (Malta 2016), 11th place
 "Fire Burn" by Dominic (Malta 2016), 13th place
 "Falling Glass" by Corazon (Malta 2016), 8th place
 "Who Needs a Heart?" by Kristel Lisberg (Denmark 2016), unplaced
 "Good Enough" by Annica Milán & Kimmo Blom (Finland 2016), 5th place
 "Superhuman" by Xandra (Romania 2016), eliminated (Semi-final)
2017
 "Tonight" by Deborah C & Josef Tabone (Malta 2017), 7th place
 "Victorious" by Virgis Valuntonis (Lithuania 2017), eliminated (Semi-final)
 "Walk On By" by Xandra (Romania 2017), 5th place
2018
 "Back to Life" by Eleanor Cassar (Malta 2018), 5th place
 "Call 2morrow" by Matthew Anthony (Malta 2018), 7th place
 "We Can Run" by Avenue Sky (Malta 2018), 9th place
 "A Thousand Times" by Angie Ott (Switzerland 2018), 5th place
 "Devoted" by Johnny Bădulescu (Romania 2018), 4th place (Semi-final)
 "Thinking About You" by Endless feat. Maria Grosu (Romania 2018) 6th place (Semi-final)
 "Try" by Xandra (Romania 2018), 9th place
 "Heaven" by MIHAI (Romania 2018), 7th place
 "The Voice" by Suren Poghosyan (Armenia 2018), 10th place (Semi-final)
 "Dišem" by Nina Petković (Montenegro 2018), 5th place
 "Aldrei gefast upp"/"Battleline" by Fókus (Iceland 2018), 5th place
2019
 "Weight of the World" by Nicola (Romania 2019), eliminated (Semi-final)
 "I Will Not Surrender" by Maxim Zavidia (Moldova 2019), 2nd place
2022
 "Naked" by Leya Leanne (Slovenia 2022), 9th place
 "Guilty" by Møise (Romania 2022), 10th place
2023
 "Love Again" by Skrellex (Norway 2023), 7th place
 "Indestructible" by Cosmina (Moldova 2023), 8th place
 "Haunted" by Lyndsay (Malta 2023), eliminated (Quarter-final)
 "Creeping Walls" by Nathan (Malta 2023), 11th place
 "Whatever Wind May Blow" by Dominic Cini & Anna Azzopardi (Malta 2023), eliminated (Semi-final)
 "Love You Like That" by Jake (Malta 2023), eliminated (Quarter-final)

Entries in national Junior Eurovision pre-selections
2015
 "Réalta na mara" by Aimee Banks, Ireland, (Ireland 2015), 1st place
2018
 "IOU" by Taylor Hynes, Ireland, (Ireland 2018), 1st place
2021
 "Change" by Yulan Law (Malta 2021), Unplaced

Other songwriting credits

References

Swedish composers
Swedish male composers
Swedish Jews
1985 births
Living people
Musicians from Stockholm